The High Commissioner of Malaysia to the People's Republic of Bangladesh is the head of Malaysia's diplomatic mission to Bangladesh. The position has the rank and status of an Ambassador Extraordinary and Plenipotentiary and is based in the High Commission of Malaysia, Dhaka.

List of heads of mission

High Commissioners to Bangladesh

See also
 Bangladesh–Malaysia relations

References 

 
Bangladesh
Malaysia